Manuripi  is one of the five provinces of Pando Department in Bolivia and is situated in the northwest of the department. Its name is derived from the Manuripi River, which passes through the province from west to east.

Location 
Manuripi province is located between 10° 49’ and 12° 30' South and between 66° 00' and 69° 14' West. It extends over a length of 370 km from Northeast to Southwest, and up to 100 km from Northwest to Southeast.

The province is situated in the Amazon lowlands of Bolivia and borders Abuná Province in the North, Nicolás Suárez Province in the Northwest, Peru in the West, La Paz Department in the South, Madre de Dios Province in the Southeast, Beni Department in the East, and Federico Román Province in the Northeast.

Population 
The population of Federico Román Province has increased by 40% over the last two decades:
1992: 7,360 inhabitants (census)
2001: 8,230 inhabitants (census)
2005: 9,505 inhabitants (est.)
2010: 10,164 inhabitants (est.)
 
47.7% of the population are younger than 15 years old. (1992)

98.0% of the population speak Spanish, 0.4% speak Quechua, and speak 0.2% Aymara. (1992)

The literacy rate of the province's population is 75.4%. (1992)

91.0% of the population have no access to electricity, 68.5% have no sanitary facilities. (1992)

84.4% of the population are Catholics, 14.6% are Protestants. (1992)

Division 
The province comprises three municipalities:
Filadelfia Municipality – 3,145 inhabitants (2005)
Puerto Rico Municipality – 4,003 inhabitants
San Pedro Municipality – 1,082 inhabitants

Places of interest 
 Manuripi-Heath Amazonian Wildlife National Reserve

References

External links 
t_manuripi.htm General map of province
manuripi.htm Detailed map of province towns and rivers
Population data (Spanish)
Social data (Spanish)

Provinces of Pando Department